Hard Times are in Fashion is the third studio album by the American indie rock band Koufax.

Background
When Koufax began recording their third album, this happened without a valid record deal. As a result, the band had to pre-finance the recording costs from their own pockets. They worked in six different studios. The band was also currently undergoing a line-up change. From the now disbanding but friendly band The Get Up Kids, the brothers Rob and Ryan Pope joined the band for the drums and bass section.

No Koufax album features as many guest musicians as this one. For example, the album was recorded with three different drummers. Guitar and piano work was also added from outside. For the first time on a Koufax album a pedal steel guitar can be heard.

Finally, the finished album was handed over to Doghouse (distribution in the USA) and to Motormusic (distribution in Europe).

Track listing

Reception
The album received mainly positive reviews:

"Hard Times are in Fashion ratcheted up the energy a bit, while also expanding their sonic palate with some pedal-steel. [...The record] deserves to be heard by more ears, so seek it out if you like your pop music smart, clever and infectious." - Waxing Nostalgic

"While Jared Rosenberg's piano is omnipresent, it isn't abused in Ben Folds Five fashion or used as an overly sappy device à la Keane or Coldplay. Instead, it's merely another instrument, sometimes battling Suchan and Ben Force's guitars point for point, other times blending deftly into the background. The album is infused with subtle political and social commentary, relating mostly to the war in Iraq, the Bush presidency, and foreigners' apparent increasing disgust with The American Way. But Koufax don't pound a listener over the head with their politics." - Allmusic

"They, too, don't wanna be to be American idiots. It may not be fair to call Hard Times Are in Fashion a political album. While its nervy pop songs are very much products of the current post-election depression, Koufax is more concerned with confronting a nation's mass apathy than outlining a revolution." - Popmatters

Personnel

The Band 

Robert Suchan – vocals, guitar, piano
Jared Rosenberg – piano, organ, keyboards
Ben Force  – guitars, bass, background vocals
Rob Pope  – bass, guitars, background vocals
Ryan Pope – drums, percussion

Additional musicians 

Matthew Casebeer - organ, piano on "Isabelle", "Blind Faith" and "Get Us Sober"
John Anderson – drums on "Get Us Sober" and "A Sad Man's Face"
Davey Latter – drums on "Her Laughter"
Eric Heywood – pedal-steel-guitar
Michael Krassner – guitars, production (see below)

Technical 

Michael Krassner – production, recording, mixing
Ken Sluiter – mixing

References

2005 albums
Koufax (band) albums
Doghouse Records albums